Critics' Choice Award may refer to:
 Critics' Choice Movie Awards, presented by Broadcast Film Critics Association (BFCA)
 Critics' Choice Television Award, presented by Broadcast Television Journalists Association (BTJA)